The Neo Geo Pocket is a monochrome handheld game console released by SNK. It was the company's first handheld system and is part of the Neo Geo family.

The Neo Geo Pocket received lower than expected sales and it was discontinued in 1999, immediately being succeeded by the Neo Geo Pocket Color, a full color device allowing the system to compete more easily with the dominant Game Boy Color handheld, and which also saw an American release. Though the system enjoyed only a short life, there were some significant games released on the system such as Samurai Shodown, and King of Fighters R-1.

Technical specifications 

 16-bit Toshiba TLCS-900H high performance core CPU
 32-bit/16-bit register bank configuration at 6.144 MHz
 Virtual screen 256×256, 16 palettes per plane, 64 sprites per frame
 Z80 8-bit CPU to control the soundchip
 SN76489 soundchip equivalent (three square-wave tone generators, one white-noise generator, and direct access to two digital-to-analog converters)
 I/O serial SIO, one channel at 19200 bit/s
 4-bit internal memory

Neo Geo Pocket cartridges are smaller than Game Boy cartridges.

Games 

The Neo Geo Pocket is forward compatible with the majority of Neo Geo Pocket Color titles, although games for the color system will play in monochrome on a Neo Geo Pocket. Likewise, the Neo Geo Pocket Color is backward compatible and the entire Neo Geo Pocket library can be played on the color system.

Only ten monochrome games were released for the Neo Geo Pocket before it was discontinued:
 Baseball Stars
 King of Fighters R-1
 Melon-chan's Growth Diary (no EU release)
 Neo Cherry Master (no EU release)
 Neo Geo Cup 98 (no EU release) 
Neo Geo Cup 98 Plus (no JPN release) 
 Pocket Tennis
 Puzzle Link (no EU release)
 Samurai Shodown
 Syougi no Tatsujin - Master of Syougi (no EU release)

After the release of the Neo Geo Pocket Color, several of these titles began receiving re-releases, updated to include color. All but King of Fighters R-1, Melon-chan's Growth Diary, Samurai Shodown and the original Neo Geo Cup 98 (the "Plus" version was updated instead) were eventually re-released for the color system.

When playing the Monochrome Samurai Shodown in the color system the game will play in color.

References 

 
1990s toys
Computer-related introductions in 1998
1999 disestablishments in Japan
Fifth-generation video game consoles
Handheld game consoles
Japan-only video game hardware
Monochrome video game consoles
Products introduced in 1998
Regionless game consoles